The womb is a major female hormone-responsive reproductive sex organ of most mammals.

Womb may also refer to:

 Womb (nightclub), in Tokyo, Japan
 Womb (film)
 Womb (album), a 2020 album by Purity Ring
 , a cultivar of Karuka
 Wombs (manga), a Japanese series by Yumiko Shirai